Elon Lindenstrauss (born August 1, 1970) is an Israeli mathematician, and a winner of the 2010 Fields Medal.

Since 2004, he has been a professor at Princeton University. In 2009, he was appointed to Professor at the Mathematics Institute at the Hebrew University.

Biography 
Lindenstrauss was born into an Israeli-Jewish family with German Jewish origins. He was also born into a mathematical family, the son of the mathematician Joram Lindenstrauss, the namesake of the Johnson–Lindenstrauss lemma, and computer scientist Naomi Lindenstrauss, both professors at the Hebrew University of Jerusalem. His sister Ayelet Lindenstrauss is also a mathematician. He attended the Hebrew University Secondary School. In 1988 he was awarded a bronze medal at the International Mathematical Olympiad.  He enlisted to the IDF's Talpiot program, and studied at the Hebrew University of Jerusalem, where he earned his BSc in Mathematics and Physics in 1991 and his master's degree in mathematics in 1995. In 1999 he finished his Ph.D., his thesis being "Entropy properties of dynamical systems", under the guidance of Prof. Benjamin Weiss. He was a member at the Institute for Advanced Study in Princeton, New Jersey, then a Szego Assistant Prof. at Stanford University. From 2003 to 2005, he was a Long Term Prize Fellow at the Clay Mathematics Institute.

In Fall 2014, he was Visiting Miller Professor at the University of California, Berkeley. Lindenstrauss is an editor for Duke Mathematical Journal and Journal d'Analyse Mathématique.

Research 
Lindenstrauss works in the area of dynamics, particularly in the area of ergodic theory and its applications in number theory. With Anatole Katok and Manfred Einsiedler, he made progress on the Littlewood conjecture.

In a series of two papers (one co-authored with Jean Bourgain) he made major progress on Peter Sarnak's Arithmetic Quantum Unique Ergodicity conjecture. The proof of the conjecture was completed by Kannan Soundararajan.

Recently with Manfred Einsiedler, Philippe Michel and Akshay Venkatesh, he studied distributions of torus periodic orbits in some arithmetic spaces, generalizing theorems by Hermann Minkowski and Yuri Linnik.

Together with Benjamin Weiss he developed and studied systematically the invariant of mean dimension introduced in 1999 by Mikhail Gromov. In related work he introduced and studied the small boundary property and stated fundamental conjectures.

Among his co-authors are Jean Bourgain, Manfred Einsiedler, Philippe Michel, Shahar Mozes, Akshay Venkatesh and Barak Weiss.

Awards 
In 1988, Lindenstrauss represented Israel in the International Mathematical Olympiad and won a bronze medal.
During his service in the IDF, he was awarded the Israel Defense Prize.
In 2003, he was awarded the Salem Prize jointly with Kannan Soundararajan.
In 2004, he was awarded the European Mathematical Society Prize.
In 2008, he received the Michael Bruno Memorial Award.
In 2009, he was awarded the Erdős Prize.
In 2009, he received the Fermat Prize.
In 2010, he became the first Israeli to be awarded the Fields Medal, for his results on measure rigidity in ergodic theory, and their applications to number theory.

References

External links 
Homepage at Hebrew University

1970 births
Living people
20th-century Israeli  mathematicians
21st-century Israeli  mathematicians
Dynamical systems theorists
Fields Medalists
Institute for Advanced Study visiting scholars
Einstein Institute of Mathematics alumni
Academic staff of the Hebrew University of Jerusalem
International Mathematical Olympiad participants
Israel Defense Prize recipients
Israeli Jews
Israeli people of German-Jewish descent
Scientists from Jerusalem
Princeton University faculty
Erdős Prize recipients